The discography of Disappear Fear (stylized as disappear fear), a Baltimore, Maryland-based indie folk band consists of ten studio albums, three live albums, one compilation album and two video albums. Their discography spans over a thirty-year career (1987–present).

Overview
Disappear Fear was formed in 1987 by sisters, Sonia Rutstein (SONiA) and Cindy Frank (CiNDY). Their first album (Echo My Call) was released under their own Disappear Records label in 1988. Their latest album (Get Your Phil) was released in 2011. This discography is inclusive as to the bands following incarnations: Disappear Fear, Sonia (Rutstein's solo career) and Sonia & Disappear Fear.

Albums

Studio albums
Disappear Fear

Sonia

Sonia & Disappear Fear

SONiA disappear fear

Live albums
Disappear Fear

Sonia

Sonia & Disappear Fear

SONiA disappear fear

Compilations
Sonia & Disappear Fear

Videos
Sonia

References

Discographies of American artists
Folk music discographies